The Shanxi Loongs, also known as Shanxi SDIC Raptors Club or Shanxi Fenjiu Shares are a Chinese professional basketball team based in Taiyuan, Shanxi, which plays in the Northern Division of the Chinese Basketball Association (CBA). The Shanxi Fenjiu Company is the club's corporate sponsor, while its mascot is a dragon.

The team was known in English as the Shanxi Brave Dragons from the Summer of 2007 until September 2018, when a rebranding ceremony was held, unveiling a new logo and nickname. Loong is the Chinese word for dragon, in both Mandarin and Cantonese.

History
Originally known as the Henan Renhe Dragons (河南仁和) due to corporate sponsorship by the Henan Renhe Group (河南仁和集团), the team rebranded as a result of an agreement signed with the Henan Jiyuan Iron & Steel Group (河南济源钢铁集团) in early November, just before the CBA's 2004–05 regular season began (jigang is an abbreviation for jiyuan gangtie or Jiyuan Iron & Steel).

In conjunction with this change—the club moved from its original home city of Zhengzhou to Jiyuan—in the middle of its first season. From 2004 to 2006 they were known as the Henan Jigang Dragons (河南济钢猛龙) or Henan Jigang or Henan Dragons, and were based in both Jiyuan and Luoyang, Henan.

During the 2004–05 CBA season, the team's first in the league, the Henan Dragons finished in seventh and last place in the CBA's North Division and out of the playoffs. In the 2005–06 CBA season they suffered the same fate yet again.

Before the 2006–07 CBA season, the team headed to Taiyuan, and changed its name to the Shanxi Yujun Dragons or Shanxi Yujun or Shanxi Dragons. They signed with a new sponsor the following year, and became known as the Shanxi Zhongyu Brave Dragons, but the club has fared little better on the court since its relocation.

In January 2010, the Brave Dragons signed former NBA All-Star Stephon Marbury. He only stayed with Shanxi through the end of the 2009–10 CBA season, before leaving for Foshan, and eventually Beijing.

In August 2011, the Brave Dragons played an exhibition game against the Georgetown University Hoyas during the Washington, D.C. squad's two-week summer trip to China, but lost by a final score of 98–81.

Playing in the IBL
The Shanxi Zhongyu Brave Dragons participated in the 2008 season of the International Basketball League (IBL). The IBL is a spring/summer league based in Portland, Oregon. They were housed at the United States Basketball Academy.

Roster

Notable players

Current International players
  Jamaal Franklin (2019–present)
  Eric Moreland (2019–present)

Former Chinese players
  Shan Tao (2007–08)
  Shang Ping (2010–12)
  Wang Lei (2005–07)
  Wu Tai-hao (2015–2018)

Former International players

  Zaid Abbas (2014–15)
  Yancy Gates (2015)
  Alexander Johnson (2011)
  Dominique Jones (2015)
  Stephon Marbury (2010)
  Olumide Oyedeji (2008–09)
  Tim Pickett (2009)
  Leon Rodgers (2010–11)
  Donta Smith (2008–10)
  Shawn Taggart (2011)
  Maurice Taylor (2009–10)
  Jeremy Tyler (2014–15)
  Von Wafer (2014–15)
  Bonzi Wells (2008–09)
  Marcus Williams (2011–14)
  Samuel Dalembert (2015–17)
  Jamaal Franklin (2015–17)
  Henry Sims (2016–17)
  Brandon Jennings (2017–18)
  Luis Scola (2017–18)

Trivia
The team and their former coach Bob Weiss are subject of the book Brave Dragons, A Chinese Basketball Team, an American Coach and Two Cultures Clashing which is about the experience of Weiss while he was coaching the team during the 2008–2009 season.

References

External links
 United States Basketball Academy official website
 Shanxi Zhongyu at Asia-Basket.com website
 Shanxi Zhongyu at Sina.com.cn website 

Chinese Basketball Association teams
International Basketball League teams
Sport in Shanxi